Kenneth Dwane "Sox" Bowersox (born November 14, 1956) is a United States Navy officer, and a former NASA astronaut. He is a veteran of five Space Shuttle launches and an extended stay aboard the International Space Station. When he launched on STS-73 at the age of 38 years and 11 months, he became the youngest person to command a Space Shuttle.

Biography
Bowersox was born November 14, 1956, in Portsmouth, Virginia, but considers Bedford, Indiana his home town. As a young boy, his family lived in Oxnard, California for seven years and he attended Rio Real Elementary School. Bowersox was active in the Boy Scouts of America, and is an Eagle Scout. He earned a Bachelor of Science degree in aerospace engineering from the United States Naval Academy in Annapolis, Maryland, before receiving his commission in 1978. A year later, in 1979, he received a Master of Science degree in mechanical engineering from Columbia University in New York City, New York. Bowersox attended the U.S. Air Force Test Pilot School and graduated with Class 85A. He served as a test pilot on A-7E and F/A-18 aircraft, and was selected as an astronaut candidate in 1987. Bowersox holds the rank of Captain in the United States Navy.

Astronaut career
He was selected as an Astronaut Pilot by NASA in 1987.

Space Shuttle missions

Bowersox first flew as a pilot on the Space Shuttle missions STS-50 and STS-61, he commanded missions STS-73, a microgravity research mission and STS-82, a Hubble Space Telescope repair mission.

ISS Expedition 6
 
He launched on STS-113 with Don Pettit and Nikolai Budarin for an extended stay aboard the ISS as the commander of ISS Expedition 6 in 2002 and 2003, returning aboard Soyuz TMA-1 rather than the Space Shuttle as a result of the fleet's grounding following the Space Shuttle Columbia disaster, which occurred during Bowersox's tour aboard the Station. During Expedition 6, Bowersox performed 2 EVAs with Pettit, totalling over 13 hours in cumulative EVA time.

After NASA
Bowersox retired from NASA on September 30, 2006. On June 16, 2009 he was appointed vice president of Astronaut Safety and Mission Assurance at SpaceX. He was inducted into the Astronaut Hall of Fame on June 8, 2010, four days after the first successful launch of SpaceX's Falcon 9 rocket.

It was reported on January 17, 2012, that Bowersox resigned from SpaceX in late December 2011.

Bowersox appeared on three episodes of the American TV show Home Improvement. Series 3, Episode 24, titled "Reality Bytes", aired 18 May 1994.

NASA administration
In July 2019, Bowersox became NASA's Acting Associate Administrator for the Human Exploration Operations Mission Directorate, replacing William Gerstenmaier. In May 2020, Bowersox again became NASA's Acting Associate Administrator for the Human Exploration Operations Mission Directorate, replacing Douglas Loverro.

Awards and decorations
Bowersox is a recipient of the National Defense Service Medal with award star, Global War on Terrorism Service Medal, Navy Sea Service Deployment Ribbon and NASA Space Flight Medal with four award stars.

On October 26, 1995, Bowersox threw out the ceremonial first pitch at Game 5 of the 1995 World Series.

References

Attribution

External links

 
 Spacefacts biography of Ken Bowersox
Space.com announcement of Bowersox's resignation from SpaceX

1956 births
Living people
United States Navy astronauts
Commanders of the International Space Station
Crew members of the International Space Station
United States Astronaut Hall of Fame inductees
People from Portsmouth, Virginia
People from Bedford, Indiana
United States Naval Academy alumni
U.S. Air Force Test Pilot School alumni
Columbia University alumni
Columbia School of Engineering and Applied Science alumni
United States Navy officers
United States Naval Aviators
American test pilots
Aviators from Virginia
Space Shuttle program astronauts
Bedford North Lawrence High School alumni
Spacewalkers